Abdolreza Ansari (1925–2020) was an Iranian engineer, bureaucrat and politician who held various government posts. He served as minister of labor (1959–1960) and minister of interior (1966–1969).

Early life and education
Ansari was born in 1925. His father was Colonel Mohammad Hossein Khan who was killed at age 26 in a battle against rebels before his birth. He graduated from the University of Tehran and Utah State University, receving degrees in agricultural engineering. He obtained his PhD in law from the University of California, Los Angeles.

Career
Following his return to Iran in 1951 Ansari started his career at the Ministry of Labor. Then he joined the Ministry of National Economy and served as the deputy director of Iran-American Joint Fund for Economic Development and as the deputy minister of state for foreign assistance. He was also the treasurer general of Iran. He became a member of the Nationalists' Party led by Manouchehr Eghbal. In 1959 he was appointed minister of labor to the cabinet of Prime Minister Manouchehr Eghbal, replacing Agha Khan Bakhtiar in the post. Ansari held the post until September 1960. He was appointed minister of interior in 1966 to the cabinet led by Prime Minister Amir-Abbas Hoveyda. Ansari's term ended in 1969, and he was replaced by Ataollah Khosravani in the post. Ansari's other positions included the managing director of Khuzestan Water and Power Authority, governor general of the Khuzestan province and managing director of the Imperial Organization for Social Services. In the latter post Ansari was the deputy of Princess Ashraf Pahlavi.

Later years, personal life and death
Ansari left Iran after the regime change in 1979 and settled in Paris, France. He was one of the founding trustees of the Persia Education Foundation based in Paris. In 2016 he published a book entitled The Shah’s Iran - Rise and Fall Conversations with an Insider of which English edition was printed by I.B. Tauris. 

Ansari was married and had three children: Nazanin, Ketayoun and Mohammad Reza. He died in Paris in December 2020.

References

External links

20th-century Iranian engineers
1925 births
2020 deaths
Government ministers of Iran
Interior Ministers of Iran
People of Pahlavi Iran
Nationalists’ Party politicians
Exiles of the Iranian Revolution in France
21st-century Iranian writers
University of Tehran alumni
Utah State University alumni
Iranian governors
University of California, Los Angeles alumni
Agricultural engineers